Belafonte at Carnegie Hall is a live double album by Harry Belafonte issued by RCA Victor. It is the first of two Belafonte Carnegie Hall albums, and was recorded on April 19 and April 20, 1959. The concerts were benefits for The New Lincoln School and Wiltwyck School, respectively. The album stayed on the charts for over three years.

The album was nominated for Album of the Year at the 1959 Grammy Awards.

Critical reception
The Rolling Stone Album Guide wrote that the album captured "a spectacular live performance."

CD track listing

The original RCA CD reissue on a single disc, omitted four tracks.

"Introduction/Darlin'Cora" – 3:59
"Sylvie" – 4:54
"Cotton Fields" – 4:18
"John Henry" – 5:11
"The Marching Saints" – 2:50
"The Banana Boat Song (Day-O)" – 3:40
"Jamaica Farewell" – 5:10
"Mama Look a Boo Boo" – 5:24
"Come Back Liza" – 3:06
"Man Smart (Woman Smarter)" – 4:23
"Hava Nagila" (Traditional) – 4:03
"Danny Boy" – 5:21
"Cucurucucú paloma" – 3:50
"Shenandoah" – 3:48
"Matilda" – 11:27

Original LP track listing
"ACT I-MOODS OF THE AMERICAN NEGRO"

Side one
"Introduction/Darlin' Cora"
"Sylvie"
"Cotton Fields"
"John Henry"
"Take My Mother Home"

Side two
"The Marching Saints"
"ACT II-IN THE CARIBBEAN"
"The Banana Boat Song (Day-O)"
"Jamaica Farewell"
"Man Piaba"
"All My Trials"

Side three
"Mama Look a Boo Boo"
"Come Back Liza"
"Man Smart (Woman Smarter)"
"ACT III-ROUND THE WORLD"
"Hava Nagila"
"Danny Boy"
"Merci Bon Dieu"

Side four
"Cucurrucucu Paloma"
"Shenandoah"
"Matilda"

The tracks in bold were omitted from the original U.S. RCA CD issue on 1 disc; The complete album was available only on RCA CD releases (on 2 discs) in Germany and Japan, on a 2 CD gold CD issue from Classic Records and a 2 CD hybrid SACD issue from Analogue Productions.

Personnel
Musicians
Harry Belafonte – vocals
Millard Thomas – guitar
Raphael Boguslav – guitar
Danny Barrajanos – bongos, conga
Norman Keenan – bass

Production
Bob Bollard – producer, liner notes
Orchestra Conducted by Bob Corman
Bob Simpson – engineer
Lee Friedlander – cover photo
John Gundelfinger – interior illustration

References
Notes

Sources
Belafonte at Carnegie Hall: The Complete Concert, RCA Victor LOC-6006 (1959)

External links
Belafonte At Carnegie Hall: The Complete Concert

1959 live albums
Albums recorded at Carnegie Hall
Harry Belafonte live albums
Grammy Award for Best Engineered Album, Non-Classical
Grammy Hall of Fame Award recipients
RCA Victor live albums
Albums conducted by Robert De Cormier